Judo competitions at the 2019 Pan American Games in Lima, Peru were held between August 8 and 11, 2019 at the Polideportivo 1, which also hosted handball.

14 medal events were contested: seven weight categories each for men and women.

The event awarded ranking points towards selection for the 2020 Summer Olympics in Tokyo, Japan.

Medal table

Medalists

Men's events

Women's events

  Rafaela Silva of Brazil was stripped of his gold medal due to a doping violation.

Participating nations
A total of 25 countries qualified judokas. The number of athletes a nation entered is in parentheses beside the name of the country.

Qualification

A total of 140 judokas qualified to compete at the games. The top nine athletes (one per NOC) in each weight category's ranking after four qualification tournaments qualified along with one spot per category for the host nation, Peru. Each nation can enter a maximum of 14 athletes (seven men and seven women).

See also
Judo at the 2020 Summer Olympics

References

External links
 
 Results book

 
2019
Events at the 2019 Pan American Games
American Games